Bąk may refer to:

Places
Bąk, Kuyavian-Pomeranian Voivodeship (north-central Poland)
Bąk, Gmina Karsin in Pomeranian Voivodeship (north Poland)
Bąk, Gmina Stara Kiszewa in Pomeranian Voivodeship (north Poland)

Other
Bąk (surname), Polish surname
Kocjan Bąk, Polish motor glider